Spring Creek is a rural locality in the Lockyer Valley Region, Queensland, Australia. In the  Spring Creek had a population of 601 people.

History 
Clarendon Provisional School opened on circa 1882. In 1903 it was renamed Springdale Provisional School. It became Springdale State School on 1 January 1909, but closed later in 1909. Its precise location is not known but it was in the vicinity of the intersection of (present day) Adare, Lake Clarendon and Spring Creek.

Southern Queensland Correctional Centre opened in January 2012.

In the  Spring Creek had a population of 601 people.

Facilitites 
Southern Queensland Correctional Centre is a 300-bed high security prison in Millers Road.

References 

Lockyer Valley Region
Localities in Queensland